17-21 Emerson Place Row was a set of historic rowhouses located at Buffalo in Erie County, New York.  It was built in 1900, by land dealer and speculator George C. Rice and demolished in 1987 due to neglect.

It was listed on the National Register of Historic Places in 1986.

References

External links
17--21 Emerson Place Row - U.S. National Register of Historic Places on Waymarking.com

Residential buildings on the National Register of Historic Places in New York (state)
Houses completed in 1900
Houses in Buffalo, New York
Demolished buildings and structures in New York (state)
Former National Register of Historic Places in New York (state)
Architecture of Buffalo, New York
National Register of Historic Places in Buffalo, New York